Jurriaan Haak ( – ) was a Dutch footballer. He was part of the Netherlands national team, playing two matches and scoring two goals. He played his first match on 17 November 1912. He had been a reserve on the national team in the 1908 Olympics in London but did not play.

Haak moved with his family from Java to Haarlem in 1904. Like his brothers Jan Haak and Albert Haak he played football for HFC Haarlem. He was also an athlete, and in September 1916 he broke the Dutch record high jump by 10 cm (from 1.69 m to 1.79 m). 

After his football career he taught mathematics and physics in the Dutch East Indies and later at the Amsterdams Lyceum and was a co-founder of the Montessori Lyceum Amsterdam in 1929. During World War II he was a member of the Dutch resistance. He and his wife Jet van Eek were arrested after search of their home revealed ration books forged for people they were sheltering. Via the Herzogenbusch concentration camp he was deported to the Sachsenhausen concentration camp, where he was killed (officially reported 'died of dysentery) in January 1945.

See also
 List of Dutch international footballers

References

 Verkamman, Van der Steen, Volkers (1999) De Internationals, de historie van Oranje. Amsterdam, Weekbladpers BV/Voetbal International.

External links
 
 

1890 births
1945 deaths
Dutch footballers
Association football midfielders
Dutch male high jumpers
Dutch resistance members
HFC Haarlem players
Netherlands international footballers
People from Semarang
People who died in Sachsenhausen concentration camp
Resistance members who died in Nazi concentration camps
Dutch people who died in Nazi concentration camps
Dutch civilians killed in World War II
Herzogenbusch concentration camp survivors
Deaths from dysentery